"Written on Ya Kitten" is the third and final single released from Naughty by Nature's third album, 19 Naughty III. It was released in 1993 and was produced by Naughty by Nature and QD III. "Written on Ya Kitten" was the least successful of the three singles released from the album, only making it to 93 on the Billboard Hot 100 and 53 on the Hot R&B/Hip-Hop Singles & Tracks. It was later featured on Nature's Finest: Naughty by Nature's Greatest Hits and Greatest Hits: Naughty's Nicest.

Critical reception
Larry Flick from Billboard wrote that the single "oozes with all the double-entendres that the title suggests. Luckily, this trio is smart enough to keep things from going beyond cute'n'cheeky wordplay. Sure, it would be nice to see NBN spend its considerable lyrical and melodic talent on more meaty fare, but harmless track does have the charm (not to mention a killer hook) to become a guilty pleasure." Ralph Tee from Music Weeks RM Dance Update noted that "far less frantic than usual, Naughty By Nature return with this suggestive kitty ditty". 

Single track listingA-Side"Written on Ya Kitten" (QDIII Radio Edit)- 3:52  
"Written on Ya Kitten" (Q-Funk Radio Edit)- 4:18  
"Written on Ya Kitten" (Instrumental)- 4:18B-Side'
"Written on Ya Kitten" (Shandi's Smooth Radio Edit)- 3:26  
"Klickow-Klickow"- 5:41 (Featuring Rottin Razkals, Road Dawgs & the Cruddy Click) 
"Klickow-Klickow" (Instrumental)- 5:41

Charts

References

1993 singles
1993 songs
Naughty by Nature songs
Tommy Boy Records singles
Songs written by Treach
Songs written by KayGee
Songs written by Vin Rock
Song recordings produced by Naughty by Nature